Neostothis is a genus of spiders in the family Nemesiidae. It was first described in 1925 by Vellard. , it contains only one Brazilian species, Neostothis gigas.

References

Nemesiidae
Monotypic Mygalomorphae genera
Spiders of Brazil